Glesatinib (MGCD265) is an experimental anti-cancer drug.

It is in phase 2 clinical trials for non-small cell lung cancer (NSCLC).

It is a spectrum selective tyrosine kinase inhibitor "for the treatment of non-small cell lung cancer (NSCLC) patients with genetic alterations of MET".

See also 
 Mirati Therapeutics

References

External links
 glesatinib@cancer.gov

Tyrosine kinase inhibitors
Acetamides
Thioureas
Fluoroarenes
Experimental cancer drugs